Dunderbukta is a bay in Wedel Jarlsberg Land at Spitsbergen, Svalbard. It has a width of about 3.5 kilometers, and is located between the headlands of Tunodden and Ispynten.

References

Bays of Spitsbergen